Acalyptris desertellus is a moth of the old family Nepticulidae. It was described by Puplesis in 1984. It is known from Turkmenistan and Uzbekistan.

References

Nepticulidae
Moths of Asia
Moths described in 1984